The Neolithic long house was a long, narrow timber dwelling built by the first farmers in Europe beginning at least as early as the period 5000 to 6000 BC. They first appeared in central Europe in connection with the early Neolithic cultures such as the Linear Pottery culture or Cucuteni culture. This type of architecture represents the largest free-standing structure in the world in its era. Long houses are present across numerous regions and time periods in the archaeological record.

The long house was a rectangular structure, 5.5 to 7.0 m wide, of variable length, around 20 m up to 45 m. Outer walls were wattle and daub, sometimes alternating with split logs, with pitched, thatched roofs, supported by rows of poles, three across. The exterior walls would have been quite short beneath the large roof. They were solid and massive, oak posts being preferred. Clay for the daub was dug from pits near the house, which were then used for storage. Extra posts at one end may indicate a partial second story. Some Linear Pottery culture houses were occupied for as long as 30 years.

It is thought that these houses had no windows and only one doorway. The door was located at one end of the house. Internally, the house had one or two partitions creating up to three areas. Interpretations of the use of these areas vary. Working activities might be carried out in the better lit door end, the middle used for sleeping and eating and the end farthest from the door could have been used for grain storage. According to another view, the interior was divided in areas for sleeping, common life and a fenced enclosure at the back end for keeping animals.

Twenty or thirty people could have lived in each house, with villages composed typically of five to eight houses. Exceptionally, nearly 30 longhouses in a fortified settlement (dating to 4300 BC, i.e., Late Linear Pottery culture) were revealed by excavations at Oslonki in Poland.

Examples
The Balbridie timber house in what is present day Aberdeenshire, Scotland, offers an outstanding example of these early timber structures. Archaeological excavations have revealed extant timber postholes that delineate the support pieces of the original structure. This site is strategically located in a fertile agricultural area along the River Dee, very close to an ancient strategic ford of the river and also near an ancient timber trackway known as the Elsick Mounth.

References
 Rodney Castleden. 1987. The Stonehenge people. 282 pages
 
 C. Michael Hogan. 2007. , Elsick Mounth, Megalithic Portal, ed A. Burnham
 
 A. W. R. Whittle and Norman Yoffee, Europe in the Neolithic: The Creation of New Worlds, 1996, Cambridge University

Line notes

Types of monuments and memorials
Neolithic Europe

de:Bandkeramische Kultur#Siedlungswesen